Aagaardtoppen is a mountain in Nordenskiöld Land at Spitsbergen, Svalbard. It reaches a height of 731 m.a.s.l. and is part of the mountain ridge of Linnéfjella. The mountain is named after Norwegian businessperson Andreas Zacharias Aagaard.

See also
Aagaardfjellet

References

Mountains of Spitsbergen